A myelodysplastic syndrome (MDS) is one of a group of cancers in which immature blood cells in the bone marrow do not mature, and as a result, do not develop into healthy blood cells. Early on, no symptoms typically are seen. Later, symptoms may include feeling tired, shortness of breath, bleeding disorders, anemia, or frequent infections. Some types may develop into acute myeloid leukemia.

Risk factors include previous chemotherapy or radiation therapy, exposure to certain chemicals such as tobacco smoke, pesticides, and benzene, and exposure to heavy metals such as mercury or lead. Problems with blood cell formation result in some combination of low red blood cell, platelet, and white blood cell counts. Some types of MDS cause an increase in the production of immature blood cells (called blasts), in the bone marrow or blood. The different types of MDS are identified based on the specific characteristics of the changes in the blood cells and bone marrow.

Treatments may include supportive care, drug therapy, and hematopoietic stem cell transplantation. Supportive care may include blood transfusions, medications to increase the making of red blood cells, and antibiotics. Drug therapy may include the medications lenalidomide, antithymocyte globulin, and azacitidine. Some people can be cured by chemotherapy followed by a stem-cell transplant from a donor.

About seven per 100,000 people are affected by MDS; about four per 100,000 people newly acquire  the condition each year. The typical age of onset is 70 years. The prognosis depends on the type of cells affected, the number of blasts in the bone marrow or blood, and the changes present in the chromosomes of the affected cells. The average survival time following diagnosis is 2.5 years. MDS was first recognized in the early 1900s; it came to be called myelodysplastic syndrome in 1976.

Signs and symptoms

Signs and symptoms are nonspecific and generally related to the blood cytopenias:
 Anemia (low RBC count or reduced hemoglobin) – chronic tiredness, shortness of breath, chilled sensation, sometimes chest pain
 Neutropenia (low neutrophil count) – increased susceptibility to infection
 Thrombocytopenia (low platelet count) – increased susceptibility to bleeding and ecchymosis (bruising), as well as subcutaneous hemorrhaging resulting in purpura or petechiae

Many individuals are asymptomatic, and blood cytopenia or other problems are identified as a part of a routine blood count:
 Neutropenia, anemia, and thrombocytopenia
 Splenomegaly or rarely hepatomegaly
 Abnormal granules in cells, abnormal nuclear shape and size
 Chromosome abnormality, including chromosomal translocations and abnormal chromosome number

Although some risk exists for developing acute myelogenous leukemia, about 50% of deaths occur as a result of bleeding or infection. However, leukemia that occurs as a result of myelodysplasia is notoriously resistant to treatment.  Anemia dominates the early course. Most symptomatic patients complain of the gradual onset of fatigue and weakness, dyspnea, and pallor, but at least half the patients are asymptomatic and their MDS is discovered only incidentally on routine blood counts. Previous chemotherapy or radiation exposure is an important factor in the person's medical history. Fever, weight loss and splenomegaly should point to a myelodysplastic/myeloproliferative neoplasm (MDS/MPN) rather than pure myelodysplastic process.

Cause
Some people have a history of exposure to chemotherapy (especially alkylating agents such as melphalan, cyclophosphamide, busulfan, and chlorambucil) or radiation (therapeutic or accidental), or both (e.g., at the time of stem cell transplantation for another disease). Workers in some industries with heavy exposure to hydrocarbons such as the petroleum industry have a slightly higher risk of contracting the disease than the general population. Xylene and benzene exposures have been associated with myelodysplasia. Vietnam veterans exposed to Agent Orange are at risk of developing MDS. A link may exist between the development of MDS "in atomic-bomb survivors 40 to 60 years after radiation exposure" (in this case, referring to people who were in close proximity to the dropping of the atomic bombs in Hiroshima and Nagasaki during World War II). Children with Down syndrome are susceptible to MDS, and a family history may indicate a hereditary form of sideroblastic anemia or Fanconi anemia.

Pathophysiology
MDS most often develops without an identifiable cause. Risk factors include exposure to an agent known to cause DNA damage, such as radiation, benzene, and certain chemotherapies; other risk factors have been inconsistently reported. Proving a connection between a suspected exposure and the development of MDS can be difficult, but the presence of genetic abnormalities may provide some supportive information. Secondary MDS can occur as a late toxicity of cancer therapy (therapy associated MDS, t-MDS). MDS after exposure to radiation or alkylating agents such as busulfan, nitrosourea, or procarbazine, typically occurs 3–7 years after exposure and frequently demonstrates loss of chromosome 5 or 7. MDS after exposure to DNA topoisomerase II inhibitors occurs after a shorter latency of only 1–3 years and can have a 11q23 translocation. Other pre-existing bone-marrow disorders such as acquired aplastic anemia following immunosuppressive treatment and Fanconi anemia can evolve into MDS.

MDS is thought to arise from mutations in the multipotent bone-marrow stem cell, but the specific defects responsible for these diseases remain poorly understood. Differentiation of blood precursor cells is impaired, and a significant increase in levels of apoptotic cell death occurs in bone-marrow cells. Clonal expansion of the abnormal cells results in the production of cells that have lost the ability to differentiate. If the overall percentage of bone-marrow myeloblasts rises over a particular cutoff (20% for WHO and 30% for FAB), then transformation to acute myelogenous leukemia (AML) is said to have occurred. The progression of MDS to AML is a good example of the multistep theory of carcinogenesis in which a series of mutations occurs in an initially normal cell and transforms it into a cancer cell.

Although recognition of leukemic transformation was historically important (see History), a significant proportion of the morbidity and mortality attributable to MDS results not from transformation to AML, but rather from the cytopenias seen in all MDS patients. While anemia is the most common cytopenia in MDS patients, given the ready availability of blood transfusion, MDS patients rarely experience injury from severe anemia.  The two most serious complications in MDS patients resulting from their cytopenias are bleeding (due to lack of platelets) or infection (due to lack of white blood cells).  Long-term transfusion of packed red blood cells leads to iron overload.

Genetics
The recognition of epigenetic changes in DNA structure in MDS has explained the success of two (namely the hypomethylating agents 5-azacytidine and decitabine) of three (the third is lenalidomide) commercially available medications approved by the U.S. Food and Drug Administration to treat MDS. Proper DNA methylation is critical in the regulation of proliferation genes, and the loss of DNA methylation control can lead to uncontrolled cell growth and cytopenias.  The recently approved DNA methyltransferase inhibitors take advantage of this mechanism by creating a more orderly DNA methylation profile in the hematopoietic stem cell nucleus, thereby restoring normal blood counts and retarding the progression of MDS to acute leukemia.

Some authors have proposed that the loss of mitochondrial function over time leads to the accumulation of DNA mutations in hematopoietic stem cells, and this accounts for the increased incidence of MDS in older patients.  Researchers point to the accumulation of mitochondrial iron deposits in the ringed sideroblast as evidence of mitochondrial dysfunction in MDS.

5q- syndrome
Since at least 1974, the deletion in the long arm of chromosome 5 has been known to be associated with dysplastic abnormalities of hematopoietic stem cells.  By 2005, lenalidomide, a chemotherapy drug, was recognized to be effective in MDS patients with the 5q- syndrome, and in December 2005, the US FDA approved the drug for this indication. Patients with isolated 5q-, low IPSS risk, and transfusion dependence respond best to lenalidomide. Typically, prognosis for these patients is favorable, with a 63-month median survival. Lenalidomide has dual action, by lowering the malignant clone number in patients with 5q-, and by inducing better differentiation of healthy erythroid cells, as seen in patients without 5q deletion.

Splicing factor mutations

Mutations in splicing factors have been found in 40–80% of cases with myelodysplastic syndrome, particularly in those with ringed sideroblasts.

IDH1 and IDH2 mutations 
Mutations in the genes encoding for isocitrate dehydrogenase 1 and 2 (IDH1 and IDH2) occur in 10–20% of patients with myelodysplastic syndrome, and confer a worsened prognosis in low-risk MDS. Because the incidence of IDH1/2 mutations increases as the disease malignancy increases, these findings together suggest that IDH1/2 mutations are important drivers of progression of MDS to a more malignant disease state.

GATA2 deficiency 
GATA2 deficiency is a group of disorders caused by a defect, familial, or sporadic inactivating mutations, in one of the two GATA2 genes. These autosomal dominant mutations cause a reduction in the cellular levels of the gene's product, GATA2. The GATA2 protein is a transcription factor critical for the embryonic development, maintenance, and functionality of blood-forming, lymph-forming, and other tissue-forming stem cells. In consequence of these mutations, cellular levels of GATA2 are low and individuals develop over time hematological, immunological, lymphatic, or other presentations. Prominent among these presentations is MDS that often progresses to acute myelocytic leukemia, or less commonly, chronic myelomonocytic leukemia.

Transient myeloproliferative disease 
Transient myeloproliferative disease is the abnormal proliferation of a clone of noncancerous megakaryoblasts in the liver and bone marrow. The disease is restricted to individuals with Down syndrome or genetic changes similar to those in Down syndrome, develops during pregnancy or shortly after birth, and resolves within 3 months, or in about 10% of cases, progresses to acute megakaryoblastic leukemia.

Diagnosis 
The elimination of other causes of cytopenias, along with a dysplastic bone marrow, is required to diagnose a myelodysplastic syndrome, so differentiating MDS from anemia, thrombocytopenia, and leukopenia is important.

A typical diagnostic investigation includes:
 Full blood count and examination of blood film: The blood film morphology can provide clues about hemolytic anemia, clumping of the platelets leading to spurious thrombocytopenia, or leukemia.
 Blood tests to eliminate other common causes of cytopenias such as lupus, hepatitis, B12, folate, or other vitamin deficiencies, kidney failure or heart failure, HIV, hemolytic anemia, monoclonal gammopathy: Age-appropriate cancer screening should be considered for all anemic patients.
 Bone marrow examination by a hematopathologist: This is required to establish the diagnosis since all hematopathologists consider dysplastic marrow the key feature of myelodysplasia.
 Cytogenetics or chromosomal studies: This is ideally performed on the bone marrow aspirate. Conventional cytogenetics require a fresh specimen since live cells are induced to enter metaphase to allow chromosomes to be seen.
 Interphase fluorescence in situ hybridization testing, usually ordered together with conventional cytogenetic testing, offers rapid detection of several chromosome abnormalities associated with MDS, including del 5q, −7, +8, and del 20q.
 Virtual karyotyping can be done for MDS, which uses computational tools to construct the karyogram from disrupted DNA. Virtual karyotyping does not require cell culture and has a dramatically higher resolution than conventional cytogenetics, but cannot detect balanced translocations.
 Flow cytometry is helpful to identify blasts, abnormal myeloid maturation, and establish the presence of any lymphoproliferative disorder in the marrow.
 Testing for copper deficiency should not be overlooked, as it can morphologically resemble MDS in bone-marrow biopsies.

The features generally used to define an MDS are blood cytopenias, ineffective hematopoiesis, dyserythropoiesis, dysgranulopoiesis, dysmegakaropoiesis, and increased myeloblasts.

Dysplasia can affect all three lineages seen in the bone marrow. The best way to diagnose dysplasia is by morphology and special stains 
(PAS) used on the bone marrow aspirate and peripheral blood smear. Dysplasia in the myeloid series is defined by:
 Granulocytic series:
 Hypersegmented neutrophils (also seen in vit B12/folate deficiency)
 Hyposegmented neutrophils (pseudo Pelger-Huet)
 Hypogranular neutrophils or pseudo Chediak-Higashi (large azurophilic granules)
 Auer rods – automatically RAEB II (if blast count < 5% in the peripheral blood and < 10% in the bone marrow aspirate); also note Auer rods may be seen in mature neutrophils in AML with translocation t(8;21)
 Dimorphic granules (basophilic and eosinophilic granules) within eosinophils
 Erythroid series:
 Binucleated erythroid precursors and karyorrhexis
 Erythroid nuclear budding
 Erythroid nuclear strings or internuclear bridging (also seen in congenital dyserythropoietic anemias)
 Loss of e-cadherin in normoblasts is a sign of aberrancy.
 PAS (globular in vacuoles or diffuse cytoplasmic staining) within erythroid precursors in the bone marrow aspirate (has no bearing on paraffin-fixed bone-marrow biopsy). Note: one can see PAS vacuolar positivity in L1 and L2 blasts (FAB classification; the L1 and L2 nomenclature is not used in the WHO classification)
 Ringed sideroblasts (10 or more iron granules encircling one-third or more of the nucleus) seen on Perls' Prussian blue iron stain (>15% ringed sideroblasts when counted among red cell precursors for refractory anemia with ring sideroblasts)
 Megakaryocytic series (can be the most subjective):
 Hyposegmented nuclear features in platelet producing megakaryocytes (lack of lobation)
 Hypersegmented (osteoclastic appearing) megakaryocytes
 Ballooning of the platelets (seen with interference contrast microscopy)

Other stains can help in special cases (PAS and naphthol ASD chloroacetate esterase positivity) in eosinophils is a marker of abnormality seen in chronic eosinophilic leukemia and is a sign of aberrancy.

On the bone-marrow biopsy, high-grade dysplasia (RAEB-I and RAEB-II) may show atypical localization of immature precursors, which are islands of immature precursors cells (myeloblasts and promyelocytes) localized to the center of the intertrabecular space rather than adjacent to the trabeculae or surrounding arterioles. This morphology can be difficult to differentiate from treated leukemia and recovering immature normal marrow elements. Also, topographic alteration of the nucleated erythroid cells can be seen in early myelodysplasia (RA and RARS), where normoblasts are seen next to bony trabeculae instead of forming normal interstitially placed erythroid islands.

Differential diagnosis
Myelodysplasia is a diagnosis of exclusion and must be made after proper determination of iron stores, vitamin deficiencies, and nutrient deficiencies are ruled out. Also, congenital diseases such as congenital dyserythropoietic anemia (CDA I through IV) have been recognized, Pearson's syndrome (sideroblastic anemia), Jordans anomaly – vacuolization in all cell lines may be seen in Chanarin-Dorfman syndrome, aminolevulinic acid enzyme deficiency and other more esoteric enzyme deficiencies are known to give a pseudomyelodysplastic picture in one of the cell lines; however, all three cell lines are never morphologically dysplastic in these entities with the exception of chloramphenicol, arsenic toxicity, and other poisons.

All of these conditions are characterized by abnormalities in the production of one or more of the cellular components of blood (red cells, white cells other than lymphocytes, and platelets or their progenitor cells, megakaryocytes).

Classification

World Health Organization
In the late 1990s, a group of pathologists and clinicians working under the World Health Organization (WHO) modified this classification, introducing several new disease categories and eliminating others. In 2008, the WHO developed a new classification scheme that is based more on genetic findings, but morphology of the cells in the peripheral blood, bone marrow aspirate, and bone marrow biopsy are still the screening tests used to decide which classification is best and which cytogenetic aberrations may be related.

The list of dysplastic syndromes under the new WHO system includes:

Note : not all physicians concur with this reclassification, because the underlying pathology of this disease is not well understood.

Myelodysplastic syndrome unclassified 
The WHO has proposed a criterion for diagnosis and classification of MDS that may apply to most cases. However, occasional cases are difficult to classify into defined categories because of one or more unusual features:
 Rare cases with less than 5% blast will present with Auer rods. These cases usually have the features of RAMD.
 Occasionally, cases of MDS present with isolated neutropenia or thrombocytopenia without anemia and with dysplastic changes confined to the single lineage. The terms refractory neutropenia and refractory thrombocytopenia have sometimes been used to describe these cases. A diagnosis of MDS in patients with neutropenia or thrombocytopenia without anemia should be made with caution.
 Patients with RA or RAEB occasionally present with leukocytosis or thrombocytosis instead of the usual cytopenia.

Management
The goals of therapy are to control symptoms, improve quality of life, improve overall survival, and decrease progression to AML.

The IPSS scoring system can help triage patients for more aggressive treatment (i.e. bone marrow transplant) as well as help determine the best timing of this therapy.  Supportive care with blood products and hematopoietic growth factors (e.g. erythropoietin) is the mainstay of therapy. The regulatory environment for the use of erythropoietins is evolving, according to a recent US Medicare National coverage determination. However, no comment on the use of hematopoietic growth factors for MDS was made in that document.

Agents have been approved by the U.S. Food and Drug Administration (FDA) for the treatment of MDS:
 5-azacytidine: 21-month median survival
 Decitabine: Complete response rate reported as high as 43%. A phase I study has shown efficacy in AML when decitabine is combined with valproic acid.
 Lenalidomide: Effective in reducing red blood cell transfusion requirement in patients with the chromosome 5q deletion subtype of MDS
 Decitabine/cedazuridine (Inqovi) is a fixed-dosed combination medication for the treatment of adults with myelodysplastic syndromes (MDS) and chronic myelomonocytic leukemia (CMML).

Chemotherapy with the hypomethylating agents 5-azacytidine and decitabine has been shown to decrease blood transfusion requirements and to retard the progression of MDS to AML. Lenalidomide was approved by the FDA in December 2005 only for use in the 5q- syndrome. In the United States, treatment of MDS with lenalidomide costs about $9,200 per month. The chemotherapy may be supported by other drugs like all-trans retinoic acid (ATRA), however the evidence of benefit is not clear.

HLA-matched allogeneic stem cell transplantation, particularly in younger (i.e. less than 40 years of age) and more severely affected patients, offers the potential for curative therapy. The success of bone marrow transplantation has been found to correlate with severity of MDS as determined by the IPSS score, with patients having a more favorable IPSS score tend to have a more favorable outcome with transplantation.

Iron levels
Iron overload can develop in MDS as a result of the RBC transfusions, which are a major part of the supportive care for anemic MDS patients. Although the specific therapies patients receive may alleviate the RBC transfusion need in some cases, many MDS patients may not respond to these treatments, thus may develop secondary hemochromatosis due to iron overload from repeated RBC transfusions.
Patients requiring relatively large numbers of RBC transfusions can experience the adverse effect of chronic iron overload on their liver, heart, and endocrine functions. 

For patients requiring many RBC transfusions, serum ferritin levels, number of RBC transfusions received, and associated organ dysfunction (heart, liver, and pancreas) should be monitored to determine iron levels. Monitoring serum ferritin may also be useful, aiming to decrease ferritin levels to .Currently, two iron chelators are available in the US, deferoxamine for intravenous use and deferasirox for oral use. These options now provide potentially useful drugs for treating the iron overload problem. A third chelating agent is available in Europe, deferiprone, for oral use, but is not available in the US.

Clinical trials in MDS patients are ongoing, with iron chelating agents to address the question of whether iron chelation alters the natural history of patients with MDS who are transfusion dependent. Reversal of some of the consequences of iron overload in MDS by iron chelation therapy has been shown. Both the MDS Foundation and the National Comprehensive Cancer Network MDS Guidelines Panel have recommended that chelation therapy be considered to decrease iron overload in selected MDS patients. Evidence also suggests a potential value exists to iron chelation in patients who will undergo a stem-cell transplant. Although deferasirox is generally well tolerated (other than episodes of gastrointestinal distress and kidney dysfunction in some patients), recently a safety warning by the FDA and Novartis was added to deferasirox treatment guidelines. Following postmarketing use of deferasirox, rare cases of acute kidney failure or liver failure occurred, some resulting in death. Due to this, patients should be closely monitored on deferasirox therapy prior to the start of therapy and regularly thereafter.

Prognosis
The outlook in MDS is variable, with about 30% of patients progressing to refractory AML. The median survival time varies from years to months, depending on type. Stem-cell transplantation offers possible cure, with survival rates of 50% at 3 years, although older patients do poorly.

Indicators of a good prognosis:
Younger age; normal or moderately reduced neutrophil or platelet counts; low blast counts in the bone marrow (< 20%) and no blasts in the blood; no Auer rods; ringed sideroblasts; normal or mixed karyotypes without complex chromosome abnormalities; and in vitro marrow culture with a nonleukemic growth pattern

Indicators of a poor prognosis:
Advanced age; severe neutropenia or thrombocytopenia; high blast count in the bone marrow (20–29%) or blasts in the blood;
Auer rods; absence of ringed sideroblasts; abnormal localization or immature granulocyte precursors in bone marrow section;
completely or mostly abnormal karyotypes, or complex marrow chromosome abnormalities and in vitro bone marrow culture with a leukemic growth pattern

Karyotype prognostic factors:
 Good: normal, -Y, del(5q), del(20q)
 Intermediate or variable: +8, other single or double anomalies
 Poor: complex (>3 chromosomal aberrations); chromosome 7 anomalies

The IPSS is the most commonly used tool in MDS to predict long-term outcome.

Cytogenetic abnormalities can be detected by conventional cytogenetics, a FISH panel for MDS, or virtual karyotype.

The best prognosis is seen with RA and RARS, where some nontransplant patients live more than a decade (typical is on the order of three to five years, although long-term remission is possible if a bone-marrow transplant is successful). The worst outlook is with RAEB-T, where the mean life expectancy is less than one year. About one-quarter of patients develop overt leukemia. The others die of complications of low blood count or unrelated diseases. The International Prognostic Scoring System is another tool for determining the prognosis of MDS, published in Blood in 1997.  This system takes into account the percentage of blasts in the marrow, cytogenetics, and number of cytopenias.

Genetic markers 
Although not yet formally incorporated in the generally accepted classification systems, molecular profiling of myelodysplastic syndrome genomes has increased the understanding of prognostic molecular factors for this disease. For example, in low-risk MDS, IDH1 and IDH2 mutations are associated with significantly worsened survival.

Epidemiology
The exact number of people with MDS is not known because it can go undiagnosed and no tracking of the syndrome is mandated. Some estimates are on the order of 10,000 to 20,000 new cases each year in the United States alone. The number of new cases each year is probably increasing as the average age of the population increases, and some authors propose that the number of new cases in those over 70 may be as high as 15 per 100,000 per year.

The typical age at diagnosis of MDS is between 60 and 75 years; a few people are younger than 50, and diagnoses are rare in children. Males are slightly more commonly affected than females.

History
Since the early 20th century, some people with acute myelogenous leukemia were begun to be recognized to have a preceding period of anemia and abnormal blood cell production.  These conditions were lumped together with other diseases under the term "refractory anemia".  The first description of "preleukemia" as a specific entity was published in 1953 by Block et al.  The early identification, characterization and classification of this disorder were problematical, and the syndrome went by many names until the 1976 FAB classification was published and popularized the term MDS.
 Michael Brecker
 Roald Dahl 
 Nora Ephron
 Joe Farrell
 Pat Hingle
 John Kirby (attorney)
 Joe Morgan (Cincinnati Reds player)
 Paul Motian
 James W. Nance
 Robin Roberts (newscaster)
 Carl Sagan
 Susan Sontag
 Fred Willard

French-American-British (FAB) classification 
In 1974 and 1975, a group of pathologists from France, the US, and Britain produced the first widely used classification of these diseases. This French-American-British classification was published in 1976, and revised in 1982. It was used by pathologists and clinicians for almost 20 years. Cases were classified into five categories:

(A table comparing these is available from the Cleveland Clinic.)

See also 
 Chloroma
 Myeloproliferative syndrome
 Clonal hematopoiesis

References

External links 

 
 Fenaux, P., et al. (2014). Myelodysplastic syndromes: ESMO Clinical Practice Guidelines for diagnosis, treatment and follow-up † Myelodysplastic syndromes: ESMO Clinical Practice Guidelines for diagnosis, treatment and follow-up. Annals of Oncology 25(suppl 3): iii57–iii69.

Myeloid neoplasia
Syndromes affecting blood
Wikipedia medicine articles ready to translate